Nicolas-Gabriel Poullot (1759–1829), called Desprez, was a French actor.

Career at Comédie-Française 
 Admission in 1792
 Appointed 215th sociétaire in 1802
 Retirement in 1816

External links 
 Base documentaire La Grange site of the Comédie-Française

18th-century French male actors
19th-century French male actors
French male stage actors
Sociétaires of the Comédie-Française
1759 births
1829 deaths
Date of birth unknown
Date of death unknown
Place of birth unknown
Place of death missing